Ruth Corset (born 9 May 1977) is an Australian racing cyclist. She originally took up cycling in 2006 after previously competing in triathlon. She won the Australian National Road Race Championships in 2010 and was second in 2009 and 2016.

Major results

2008
 6th Overall Women's Tour of New Zealand
2009
 1st Stage 6 La Route de France
 Oceania Road Championships
2nd  Road race
10th Time trial
 2nd Road race, National Road Championships
 2nd Overall Tour Féminin en Limousin
 4th Overall Women's Tour of New Zealand
 4th Coupe du Monde Cycliste Féminine de Montréal
 5th GP de Plouay – Bretagne
 7th Liberty Classic
2010
 1st  Road race, National Road Championships
 2nd Overall Tour Féminin en Limousin
 3rd Overall Tour Cycliste Féminin International de l'Ardèche
1st Stage 2 (ITT)
 4th Overall Women's Tour of New Zealand
 4th Trofeo Alfredo Binda-Comune di Cittiglio
 7th Liberty Classic
2011
 3rd Time trial, National Road Championships
 3rd Overall Women's Tour of New Zealand
 5th Time trial, Oceania Road Championships
 6th Overall Giro d'Italia Femminile
2013
 Oceania Road Championships
3rd  Time trial
4th Road race
2015
 7th Cadel Evans Great Ocean Road Race
2016
 2nd Road race, National Road Championships
 5th Road race, Oceania Road Championships
 8th Cadel Evans Great Ocean Road Race
2023
 1st Hill Climb Championship (QOM) Road race, National Road Championships

References

External links
 

1977 births
Living people
Australian female cyclists
People from East Sepik Province
20th-century Australian women
21st-century Australian women